Laccaria proxima  is a species of edible mushroom in the genus Laccaria from the conifer forest of California, as well as eastern and northern North America.

References

External links
 
 

Edible fungi
proxima